The Irish League in season 1907–08 comprised 8 teams, and Linfield won the championship.

League standings

Results

References
Northern Ireland - List of final tables (RSSSF)

1907-08
Ireland
Irish